Altissima pressione (Highest Pressure) is a 1965 Italian "musicarello" film directed by Enzo Trapani.

Cast
Dino as  Roberto
Gianni Morandi
Rosemary Dexter  as  Serenella
Fabrizio Capucci
Lucio Dalla
Nicola Di Bari
Micaela Esdra  as   Lia
Lilly Bistrattin  as   Gianna
Anna Maria Checchi  as  Laura
Léa Nanni  as  Daniela
Maria Grazia Spina  as  Presentatrice
Gianluca Amadio  as   Sandro
Mauro Bronchi as   Fausto
Roberto Palmieri  as   Gigi
Mimmo Poli  as  Il salumiere

External links 
 

1965 films
1960s Italian-language films
1965 musical comedy films
Films scored by Ennio Morricone
Musicarelli
1960s Italian films